Progress M-24 was a Russian uncrewed cargo spacecraft which was launched in 1994 to resupply the Mir space station; causing minor damage to the station as the result of a collision during a failed attempt to dock.

Spacecraft
The forty-second of sixty four Progress spacecraft to visit Mir, M-24 used the Progress-M 11F615A55 configuration, and had the serial number 224. It carried supplies including food, water and oxygen for the EO-16 crew aboard Mir, as well as equipment for conducting scientific research, and fuel for adjusting the station's orbit and performing manoeuvres. Amongst its cargo were two new spacesuits, three fire extinguishers, oxygen candles, and equipment to facilitate repairs to Mir's life support system.

Flight
Progress M-24 was launched at 14:25:12 UTC on 25 August 1994, atop a Soyuz-U carrier rocket flying from Site 1/5 at the Baikonur Cosmodrome. Following two days of free flight, it approached the forward port of Mir's core module on 27 August, however an attempt to dock with the station failed. A second attempt was made on 30 August, however this also failed, with the Progress colliding with the space station. Following these failures of the automated docking system, a manual docking using TORU, under the control of cosmonaut Yuri Malenchenko, was performed at 13:30:28 on 2 September.

Progress M-24 undocked from Mir at 18:55:52 UTC on 4 October 1994, manoeuvring away from the station and beginning a deorbit burn at 21:44. The spacecraft was destroyed during reentry over the Pacific Ocean at 22:43:00.

See also

1994 in spaceflight
List of Progress flights
List of uncrewed spaceflights to Mir
Progress M-34

References

Spacecraft launched in 1994
Progress (spacecraft) missions
Spacecraft which reentered in 1994